The Blue River is a tributary of the Dease River in the Cassiar Country of the Northern Interior of British Columbia, Canada, flowing southeast into the latter river at the Blue River Indian Reserve No. 1 of the Liard First Nation.

See also
Blue River (North Thompson River), another Blue River near the community of the same name on the North Thompson River
Blue River (disambiguation)

References

Rivers of British Columbia
Cassiar Land District